{{Speciesbox
| image = Paphiopedilum venustum.jpg
| image_caption = Flower of Paphiopedilum venustum
| status = 
| status_system =
| genus = Paphiopedilum
| species = venustum
| authority = (Wall. ex Sims) Pfitzer
| synonyms =
 Cypripedium venustum Wall. ex Sims (basionym)
 Stimegas venustum (Wall. ex Sims) Raf.
 Cypripedium pardinum Rchb.f.
 Cypripedium venustum var. measuresianum auct.
 Paphiopedilum pardinum (Rchb.f.) Pfitzer
 Paphiopedilum venustum var. pardinum (Rchb.f.) Pfitzer
 Cordula venusta (Wall. ex Sims) Rolfe
 Paphiopedilum venustum var. bhutanensis Pradhan
 Paphiopedilum venustum var. rubrum Pradhan
 Paphiopedilum venustum var. teestaensis Pradhan
 Paphiopedilum venustum f. measuresianum (auct.) Braem
 Paphiopedilum venustum f. pardinum (Rchb.f.) Braem
}}Paphiopedilum venustum'' is a species of orchid ranging from eastern Nepal to northeastern Bangladesh.

References

External links 

venustum
Orchids of Bangladesh
Orchids of Nepal